Scoliacma brunnea is a moth in the family Erebidae. It was described by Herbert Druce in 1899. It is found in New Guinea. The habitat consists of both lowlands and areas at higher altitudes.

References

Moths described in 1899
Lithosiina